Kerala Lalithakala Academy for Fine Arts is an autonomous body which was established in 1962 to promote art and artistic heritage, based at Thrissur in Kerala. Murali Cheeroth is the newly appointed chairman of Kerala Lalitha Kala Akademi on 2022 January.

Though the Government of Kerala provides funding and support for the academy, the administration of the academy is designed to be autonomous by its constitution. The academy recognizes superior art works every year through its awards. The aim of the Academy is to promote the culture, painting, plastic and visual arts.

See also
Arts of Kerala
Lalit Kala Akademi

Notable people
 

Kattoor Narayana Pillai
Sathyapal T. A, former secretary & chairman

References

External links

OpenArt India - Confederation of Indian Artists, Fine Arts and Crafts
 Official website of the Kerala Lalithakala Akademi

Arts of Kerala
Arts organisations based in India
Lalit Kala Akademi
Organisations based in Thrissur
1962 establishments in Kerala